The Pony Express Pipeline (PXP) is a  pipeline connecting Guernsey, Wyoming with the oil hub of Cushing, Oklahoma.

Overview
In 2013 agreement was reached to convert the natural gas pipeline to carry crude oil from the Bakken formation shale plays in North Dakota and Montana. It is supposed to connect with the planned Double H Pipeline. The project is being developed by Tallgrass Pony Express Pipeline, LLC (Tallgrass Energy Partners). Construction was completed in October 2014.

See also
 Tallgrass Energy Partners
 List of oil pipelines
 List of oil refineries

References

External links
 Pony Express Pipeline
 Spur to refinery in El Dorado, Kansas
 Pony Express Conversion May 2013, Vol. 240, No. 5 Pipeline and Gas Journal

Crude oil pipelines in the United States
Pipelines in Wyoming
Oil pipelines in Oklahoma